Saints Peter and Paul School is a parochial, Roman Catholic, co-educational, day school in Easton, Maryland.  It is located in the heart of the Eastern Shore. The school serves an area of seven counties. The High School shares a campus with the Elementary School but has its own principal, staff and faculty. It is run by the Roman Catholic Diocese of Wilmington and is the only Catholic High School on Maryland's Eastern Shore.

References

External links
Official Website

1958 establishments in Maryland
Educational institutions established in 1958
Roman Catholic Diocese of Wilmington
Catholic secondary schools in Maryland
Schools in Talbot County, Maryland